Minicymbiola is a genus of sea snails, marine gastropod mollusks in the family Volutidae.

Species
Species within the genus Minicymbiola include:

 Minicymbiola corderoi (Carcelles, 1953)

References

Volutidae
Monotypic gastropod genera